The following radio stations broadcast on FM frequency 95.4 MHz:

Fiji
 2day FM in Suva, Nadi, Lautoka, Yasawa, Labasa, Savusavu, and Taveuni

Malaysia
 My in Johor Bahru, Johor and Singapore

New Zealand
 The Rock in Palmerston North

Republic of Ireland
 Classic Hits in West Cork

United Kingdom
 BBC Radio Berkshire in Windsor
 BBC Radio Wales in Wrexham and Chester

References

Lists of radio stations by frequency